The Cat o' Nine Tails is a 1971 giallo film written and directed by Dario Argento, adapted from a story by Dardano Sacchetti, Luigi Cozzi, and an uncredited Bryan Edgar Wallace. It stars Karl Malden, James Franciscus, and Catherine Spaak.

Although it is the middle entry in Argento's so-called "Animal Trilogy" (along with The Bird with the Crystal Plumage and Four Flies on Grey Velvet), the "cat o' nine tails" does not directly refer to a literal cat, nor to a literal multi-tailed whip; rather, it refers to the number of leads that the protagonists follow in the attempt to solve a murder.

The film was a commercial success in Italy but not in the rest of Europe. However, it was acclaimed in the United States. Argento admitted in the book Broken Mirrors, Broken Minds: The Dark Dreams of Dario Argento that he was less than pleased with the film, and has repeatedly cited it as his least favorite of all of his films.

Plot 
An unknown individual breaks into the Terzi Medical Institute but supposedly takes nothing. One of the Institute doctors, Calabresi, confides to his fiancée, Bianca Merusi, that he knows who broke into the Institute and why. He attempts to blackmail the individual, but the thief pushes him in front of an arriving train, killing him. A paparazzi photographer captures Calabresi's fall, but not the killer.

Reporter Carlo Giordani has been covering the break-in investigation and writes an article about Calabresi's death, including the photo.  Franco "Cookie" Arnò, a middle-aged blind man who was once an ace reporter, and his niece Lori visit Carlo after reading the article. Franco has a hunch that someone cropped the newspaper photo, and a call to the photographer confirms this. However, after they ask the photographer to print the entire picture, someone strangles him to death. The killer takes the photo and all the negatives before Carlo, Franco, and Lori arrive.

Carlo, impressed with  Franco, lets him assist his investigation. Discussing the case, they observe nine leads: the five remaining Institute scientists (Mombelli, Esson, Casoni, Braun, and director Terzi), Terzi's daughter Anna, Bianca (Calabresi's fiancée), the original break-in, and the missing photographs. They joke that the case is like a Cat o' nine tails and resolve to follow each lead.

Carlo interviews Anna, who reveals that the institute has been researching "XYY syndrome." Their study suggests that people with the XYY chromosome have a "criminal tendency." Meanwhile, Franco and Lori meet with Bianca, who provides no additional information, but Lori remarks to Franco that Bianca was nervously fingering a locket as she spoke.

That night, Bianca searches Calabresi's car and finds a note detailing the thief/killer's identity. She hides the note in her locket. Bianca returns to her apartment, where the killer strangles her. The killer searches her but cannot find the note, which is hidden in the locket.

Despite receiving a threatening note from the killer, Carlo and Franco continue investigating. Carlo speaks with other Institute doctors. Dr. Mombelli  reveals that everyone at the Institute submitted blood samples to be tested for the XYY research. At the same time, Dr. Casoni speculates that testing for XYY may become a method for crime prevention. That night, Carlo and Franco both avoid separate attempts to kill them.

Franco tells Carlo that Bianca must have died because the killer suspected she had evidence, and, remembering Lori mentioning Bianca's locket, he speculates the proof may be in the locket. They discover that Bianca got buried with the locket, so they go to her family crypt and search her coffin. Inside the locket, they find the folded note, but before they can read it, the killer shuts the crypt door, locking Carlo inside and attacking Franco outside. The killer takes the note, but Franco stabs him with his sword cane, causing the killer to flee. The killer calls Franco and Carlo, revealing that he has kidnapped Lori and will kill her unless they stop investigating. Knowing that the killer will kill Lori regardless, they call the police.

Franco, Carlo, and the police rush to the Terzi Institute to search for Lori, but they cannot find her. Carlo follows a trail of blood to the roof and finds Casoni, the killer, still bleeding from Franco's attack. Casoni prepares to stab a bound and gagged Lori, but Carlo leaps in front of her and gets stabbed in the shoulder. The police arrive on the roof and chase Casoni. Franco stops him with his cane blade; Casoni confesses that he initially broke in to replace the records that showed he tested positive for the XYY chromosome. When Franco asks about Lori, Casoni lies to Franco that he killed her. Enraged, Franco knocks him through a skylight and down an elevator shaft to his death as a now-free Lori calls out for Franco.

Cast 

 James Franciscus as Carlo Giordani
 Karl Malden as Franco "Cookie" Arnò
 Catherine Spaak as Anna Terzi
 Pier Paolo Capponi as Police Supt. Spimi
 Horst Frank as Dr. Braun
 Rada Rassimov as Bianca Merusi
 Tino Carraro as Professor Fulvio Terzi
 Cinzia De Carolis as Lori
 Aldo Regianni as Dr. Casoni
 Carlo Alighiero as Dr. Calabresi
 Vittorio Congia as Righetto
 Ugo Fangareggi as Gigi the Loser
 Tom Felleghy as Dr. Esson
 Emilio Marchisini as Dr. Mombelli
 Werner Pochath as Manuel
 Fulvio Mingozzi as Spimi's man
 Corrado Olmi as Morsella
 Pino Patti as Barber

Production
Dario Argento and Dardano Sacchetti together mapped out the plot for The Cat o' Nine Tails, and split the writing of the screenplay between them. However, because the production was set up on the basis of the first 40 pages of the script, and those pages were all written by Argento, Argento demanded that he receive sole screenplay credit. Being credited for story alone meant a substantial pay cut for Sacchetti, so this set off a bitter and publicized dispute between Sacchetti and Dario and Salvatore Argento (the film's producer, and Dario's father).

The Cat o' Nine Tails was shot between September and October 1970. The film was shot on location in Berlin, Turin, and at Cinecitta Studios in Rome.

Release
The Cat o' Nine Tails was released in Italy on February 11, 1971. International releases included the United States in May 1971, West Germany on July 15, 1971, where it was distributed by Constantin and in France on August 11, 1971, where it was distributed by Wild Side.

Box office
On its release in Italy in 1971, the film grossed a total of 2.4 billion Italian lire.

Critical reception
On the review aggregator website Rotten Tomatoes, The Cat o' Nine Tails holds an approval rating of 82% based on 22 critic reviews, with an average rating of 6.5 out of 10. The site's critical consensus reads, "The Cat O'Nine Tails is a solidly entertaining Argento outing elevated by a well-chosen cast and the director's distinctive visual style." On Metacritic, the film has a weighted average score of 63 out of 100 based on 5 critic reviews, indicating "generally favorable reviews".

Footnotes

References

External links 
 

1971 films
1970s thriller films
1971 LGBT-related films
Italian thriller films
Italian LGBT-related films
French thriller films
West German films
German thriller films
1970s Italian-language films
Films directed by Dario Argento
Giallo films
Italian serial killer films
Films scored by Ennio Morricone
Films about blind people
Films set in Italy
Films with screenplays by Dario Argento
Films set in Turin
Films shot in Berlin
Films shot at Cinecittà Studios
English-language French films
English-language German films
English-language Italian films
1970s Italian films
1970s French films
1970s German films